Jacques-François Amand (1730–1769) was a French painter of historical subjects.

Amand was born at Gault, near Blois, in 1730.  He studied under Pierre L'Enfant. In 1755 he was awarded the Prix de Rome for his Samson and Delilah; he afterwards exhibited at the Salon numerous subjects from ancient history and mythology. He also engraved several of his own compositions. He died at Paris, in 1769.

References
 

18th-century French painters
French male painters
1730 births
1769 deaths
Artists from Blois
Prix de Rome for painting
18th-century French male artists